The 4th World Table Tennis Championships were held in Berlin from January 21 to 26, 1930.

Medalists

Team

Individual

References

External links
ITTF Museum

 
World Table Tennis Championships
World Table Tennis Championships
World Table Tennis Championships
Table tennis competitions in Germany
International sports competitions hosted by Germany
World Table Tennis Championships
1930s in Berlin
Sports competitions in Berlin